The men's 100 metres is a sprint event in the sport of athletics which features in all international level competitions that include track and field. Per standard rules for individual competitions, medals are awarded to the top three finishers in international 100 m finals. There are two global-level competitions: the 100 metres at the Olympics and the 100 metres at the World Athletics Championships. Beyond that the 100 m is contested in continental-level athletics championships and multi-sport events, as well as regional and community-based international competitions.

This list includes men's 100 m medallists in non-team-based international competitions that are open class, which indicates there are no restrictions on age, disability, occupation, or other affiliations beyond nationality.

Olympic Games

World Championships

African Games

Asian Games

Central American and Caribbean Games

Commonwealth Games

East Asian Games

Goodwill Games

Jeux de la Francophonie

Lusofonia Games

Mediterranean Games

Pan American Games

South American Games

African Championships

Asian Championships

Central American and Caribbean Championships in Athletics

European Championships

Ibero-American Championships in Athletics

NACAC Championships

South American Championships

References

100 metres
International medallists men
International medallists 100 metre